The Black American Heritage Flag —(also known as the African-American Heritage Flag) is an ethnic flag that represents the culture and history of African-American people. Each color and symbol on the flag has a significant meaning that was developed to instil pride in Black Americans, and provide them with a symbol of hope for the future in the midst of their struggle for Civil Rights.

History 
The flag was created in 1967 by Melvin Charles and Gleason T. Jackson.  The idea to create the flag came about when Charles realized that every other group of people had a flag at parades except Black Americans. He designed the flag alongside Jackson and they would later travel the country to visit various churches, schools, and public events to promote the flag.

Design 

The color red represents the blood shed by African Americans for freedom and equality in America. The color black represents pride in the black race. The color gold represents intellect, prosperity, and peace.

Popularity 
The re-discovery and revival of the Black American Heritage flag on social media has led to the presence of the flag and its colors being at several events and institutions. In 2021, a popular African-American rapper named Saweetie attended the Met Gala and wore a custom Christian Cowan gown that showcased the colors of the Black American Heritage Flag alongside the colors of the Filipino flag to represent both parts of her multi-ethnic background. The flag was also seen being worn at the United States of America Ms.2022 pageant by Keerah Yeowang, who won the title.

References 

Ethnic flags
Flags of the United States
Flags introduced in 1967
1967 establishments in the United States
African-American culture